Tha Blue Carpet Treatment Mixtape is a mixtape by American West Coast hip hop artist Snoop Dogg; it was released on November 18, 2006. The mixtape contains appearances from Nate Dogg, Ice Cube, Young Jeezy, Game, Xzibit, Flavor Flav, B. Real, Warzone, Western Union, Daz Dillinger, E-40, Goldie Loc, Kurupt, J. Wells, MC Eiht, Swizz Beatz, Lil Wayne, Big Daddy Kane and Katt Williams. Tha Blue Carpet Treatment Mixtape was released as a prelude to his eighth studio album, Tha Blue Carpet Treatment.

Track listing

Release history

References 

2006 mixtape albums
Snoop Dogg albums
DJ Drama albums
Doggystyle Records albums